The greater yellownape (Chrysophlegma flavinucha) is a species of bird in the woodpecker family Picidae.

It is found in East Asia from northern and eastern India to south-eastern China, Indochina, Hainan, and Sumatra. Its natural habitats are subtropical or tropical moist lowland forest and subtropical or tropical moist montane forest.

Description
Large, olive green woodpecker with prominent yellow-crested nape and throat. Dark olive green with grey underparts. Crown brownish and flight feathers chestnut barred with black. Bill often looks whitish.

Gallery

References

greater yellownape
Birds of Nepal
Birds of Eastern Himalaya
Birds of Yunnan
Birds of South China
Birds of Hainan
Birds of Southeast Asia
greater yellownape
Taxonomy articles created by Polbot